Kimbu is a Bantu language of Tanzania. In 1992, use of Kimbu was declining but still in regular use in certain contexts. As of 2018, most children of Kimbu speakers learn Swahili as a first language, and do not learn Kimbu well.

References

External links
 Sample of the Kimbu language

Languages of Tanzania
Northeast Bantu languages